Ngāti Tumutumu is a Māori iwi of New Zealand, named after the eponymous ancestor Te Ruinga, son of Tumutumu. They live at Te Aroha in the Hauraki District.

See also
List of Māori iwi

External links
 Hauraki Māori Trust Board

 
Te Aroha